Nathaniel Clark Reed or Read (circa 1810 – December 28, 1853) was a lawyer from the U.S. state of Ohio who sat on the Ohio Supreme Court for seven years.

Biography
Nathaniel Reed, sometimes spelled Read, was born about 1810 in Champaign County, Ohio. He attended Ohio University in Athens, Ohio and studied law under Israel Hamilton of Urbana, Ohio. After he was admitted to the bar, he moved to Cincinnati, Ohio.

Reed was elected to a two-year term as prosecuting attorney of Hamilton County in 1835. He was elected by the legislature as presiding judge of the Court of Common Pleas ninth circuit in 1839. He also was on the Ohio University Board of Trustees from 1840 to 1845.

Reed was elected by the legislature to the Ohio Supreme Court in 1842 to a seven-year term to replace Frederick Grimke, resigned. In 1845 he wrote the opinion in State vs. Hopess, a fugitive slave case, where Reed upheld the Fugitive Slave Law of 1793. When Reed's term expired in 1849, abolitionists held a majority in the legislature, and they chose Rufus Paine Spalding to replace Reed.

Reed returned to Cincinnati, but soon moved to San Francisco, California, where he practiced law. He died there in 1853 and was buried at Yerba Buena Cemetery, which was relocated to City Cemetery.

Reputation

Nineteenth-century authors assessed Reed as learned and wise, but they also alluded to personal vices which led to an early death:

Notes

References

1810 births
1853 deaths
County district attorneys in Ohio
Ohio Democrats
Ohio state court judges
Justices of the Ohio Supreme Court
Ohio University alumni
Ohio University trustees
People from Champaign County, Ohio
Politicians from Cincinnati
California lawyers
19th-century American judges
19th-century American lawyers